Sam Andrews (born 3 February 1982) is an English List A cricketer who played his only match for Surrey Cricket Board.  His only List A game was against Surrey County Cricket Club. he scored 0 and did not get a wicket after bowling 6 overs.
He played 8 Second XI championship games for Surrey's Second XI team. and 2 games for Surrey's Second XI in the Second XI trophy.

He also played two games for Surrey Cricket board in the Minor Counties Trophy.

References

1982 births
Living people
English cricketers
Surrey Cricket Board cricketers
People from Hammersmith
People from Surrey